Oscar Ouma Achieng (born 3 May 1989) is a Kenyan rugby sevens player. He was selected for the n squad for the 2016 Summer Olympics. He was named in 's squad for the 2014 Commonwealth Games in Glasgow, Scotland.

He formerly played for Kandy S.C in Sri Lanka.

References

External links 
 
 
 

1989 births
Living people
Rugby sevens players at the 2016 Summer Olympics
Olympic rugby sevens players of Kenya
Kenya international rugby sevens players
Male rugby sevens players
Kenyan rugby union players
Rugby sevens players at the 2018 Commonwealth Games
Commonwealth Games competitors for Kenya
Rugby union flankers
Rugby union number eights
Simbas players